The Odes of Solomon are a collection of 42 odes attributed to Solomon. The Odes are generally dated to either the first century or to the second century, while a few have suggested a later date. The original language of the Odes is thought to have been either Greek or Syriac, and the majority of scholars believe it to have been written by a Christian, likely a convert from the Essene community to Christianity, because it contains multiple similarities to writings found in Qumran. Some have argued that the writer had even personally seen the Apostle John. A minority of scholars have suggested a Gnostic origin, but this theory is not widely supported.

Manuscript history 
The earliest extant manuscripts of the Odes of Solomon date from around the end of the 3rd century and the beginning of the 4th century: the Coptic Pistis Sophia, a Latin quote of a verse of Ode 19 by Lactantius, and the Greek text of Ode 11 in Papyrus Bodmer XI. Before the 18th century, the Odes were only known through Lactantius' quotation of one verse and their inclusion in two lists of religious literature.

The British Museum purchased the Pistis Sophia (Codex Askewianus, now British Library Add MS 5114) in 1785. The Coptic manuscript, a codex of 174 leaves, was probably composed in the late 3rd century. The manuscript contains the complete text of two of the Odes, portions of two others, and what is believed to be Ode 1 (this ode is unattested in any other manuscript and may not be complete). Pistis Sophia is a Gnostic text composed in Egypt, perhaps a translation from Greek with Syrian provenance.

After the discovery of portions of the Odes of Solomon in Pistis Sophia, scholars searched to find more complete copies of these intriguing texts. In 1909, James Rendel Harris discovered a pile of forgotten leaves from a Syriac manuscript lying on a shelf in his study. Unfortunately, all he could recall was that they came from the 'neighbourhood of the Tigris'. The manuscript (Cod. Syr. 9 in the John Rylands Library) is the most complete of the extant texts of the Odes. The manuscript begins with the second strophe of the first verse of Ode 3 (the first two odes have been lost). The manuscript gives the entire corpus of the Odes of Solomon through to the end of Ode 42. Then the Psalms of Solomon (earlier Jewish religious poetry that is often bound with the later Odes) follow, until the beginning of Psalm 17:38 and the end of the manuscript has been lost. However, the Harris manuscript is a late copy — certainly no earlier than the 15th century.
In 1912, F. C. Burkitt discovered an older manuscript of the Odes of Solomon in the British Museum (now British Library Add MS 14538). The Codex Nitriensis came from the Monastery of the Syrian in Wadi El Natrun, sixty miles west of Cairo. It presents Ode 17:7b to the end of Ode 42, followed by the Psalms of Solomon in one continuous numbering. Nitriensis is written in far denser script than the Harris manuscript, which often makes it illegible. However, Nitriensis is earlier than Harris by about five centuries (although Mingana dated it to the 13th century).

In 1955–6, Martin Bodmer acquired a number of manuscripts. Papyrus Bodmer XI appears to be a Greek scrap-book of Christian religious literature compiled in Egypt in the 3rd century. It includes the entirety of Ode 11 (headed ΩΔΗ ΣΟΛΟΜΩΝΤΟϹ), which includes a short section in the middle of the Ode that does not occur in the Harris version of it. Internal evidence suggests that this additional material is original to the Ode, and that the later Harris manuscript has omitted it.

Authorship

Language and date
Although earlier scholars thought the Odes were originally written in Greek or Hebrew, there is now a consensus that Syriac/Aramaic was the original language. Their place of origin seems likely to have been the region of Syria. Estimates of the date of composition range from the first to the third century AD, with many settling on the second century. Some have claimed that Ode 4 discusses the closing of the temple at Leontopolis
in Egypt which would date this writing about 73 CE. One of the strong arguments for an early date is the discovery of references to, and perhaps even quotations from, the Odes in the writings of St. Ignatius of Antioch. Possible allusions were also made by Justin Martyr and Irenaeus, which also supports an early date. The Odes have clear similarities to the Gospel of John, which suggests the writer was in the same community as where the book was written.

There is wide agreement that the Odes are related to the Gospel of John and the Dead Sea scrolls, thus Charlesworth concludes that the writer was an Essene convert to the Johannine community.

Liturgical use

The Odes of Solomon were, perhaps, composed for liturgical use. In the Syriac manuscripts, all of the Odes end with a hallelujah, and the Harris manuscript marks this word in the middle of an ode by the Syriac letter hê. The use of plural imperative and jussive verb-forms suggest that on occasion a congregation is being addressed. Bernard, Aune, Pierce and others who have commented on the Odes find in them clear early baptismal imagery — water is an ever-present theme (floods, drinking the living waters, drowning and the well-spring) as is the language of conversion and initiation. Charlesworth has led the criticism of this view.

Themes

Evangelism
The Odes reflect a surprising emphasis on spreading the knowledge of God, and conversion of others.

According to James H. Charlesworth, "the key characteristic in these hymns is a joyous tone of thanksgiving for the advent of the Messiah who had been promised (cf. Ode 7:1-6; 41:3-7) and for the present experience of eternal life and love from and for the Beloved (3:1-9; 11:1-24; 23:1-3; 26:1-7; 40:1-6)".

Theology 
Though there is some dispute, according to Chadwick the Odes are likely part of the proto-Orthodox Christian strain, with slight differences, as Odist appears to have mixed ideas from the Essene community with Christianity. Others, such as James White, have argued that the book is influenced by Gnosticism.

Soteriology 

It has been argued by some that the Odes support the doctrine of predestination; for example, they state, "And before they had existed, I recognized them; and imprinted a seal on their faces." Others, however, do not agree that the Odes support predestination, arguing that the writer had in mind, not unconditional election, but election based on foreknowledge. 

According to Thomas R. Schreiner, the soteriology of the Odes is highly grace oriented being underlined by a doctrine of election and he argued the writer saw salvation as a work of God which is not accomplished by human merit. Thomas R. Schreiner and Brian J. Arnold argued that the book supports a form of imputed righteousness.

Eschatology 
The book makes mention of the Antichrist figuratively, using the word "dragon" for the Antichrist.

The Odes perhaps references the general resurrection.

Christology 
Some have argued that the book has docetic leanings, however it also appears to suggest that the birth of Jesus, though miraculous, was still a human birth, which would contradict docetism. It is also probable that Ignatius of Antioch who opposed docetism (or vice versa) made use of the Odes of Solomon. Ode 8:5-6 have also been argued to refer to the resurrection of Christ. Additionally the strong ties of the Odes to Johannine works suggests against docetism.

The Odes of Solomon mention Christ as the Logos and that he is pre-existent. The Odes contain many common Christian teachings, such as the Messiah is the Son of God and the atonement of Jesus. The Odist calls Jesus both the son of Man and son of God.

The Odes possibly contain the earliest non-biblical attestation of the virgin birth, depending on the date of writing.

The book mentions the mother of the Messiah, he alludes to his death by crucifixion and his descent into Hades.

Trinity 
The book mentions the "Father, Son and the Holy Spirit"  and seem to have trinitarian theology without any indications of subordinationism unlike later Tertullian and Origen would have.

Baptism 
The book also apparently makes allusions to baptism but not to the Eucharist. Possible baptismal themes include renewal (Ode 36:5), new creation (Ode 15:8, 21:3), the sealing of the Holy Spirit (Ode 4:7), entry into paradise (Ode 11:16), the Trinitarian formula (Ode 23:22), and circumcision (Ode 11). The presence of these themes has led some scholars to argue that the Odes are a collection of baptismal hymns. The writer seems to have been influenced by Jewish apocalyptic thought and mysticism.

Other 
The Odist perhaps has an understanding of "priesthood of all believers", seeing himself as an individual priest offering spiritual sacrifices.

The Odes says that Mary had no pain during childbirth and the midwife was absent, which suggests the doctrine of virginitas in partu meaning that Mary was still a virgin after childbirth. The statement could also be an allusion to the Exodus story, where Jewish women had very quick childbirth, which is why the Egyptian midwives could not come fast enough.

Relation to the Psalms of Solomon

Technically the Odes are anonymous, but in many ancient manuscripts, the Odes of Solomon are found together with the similar Psalms of Solomon, and Odes began to be ascribed to the same author. Unlike the Psalms of Solomon, however, Odes is much less clearly Jewish, and much more Christian in appearance. Odes explicitly refers not only to Jesus, but also to the ideas of virgin birth, harrowing of hell, and the Trinity. Adolf Harnack suggested the work of a Christian interpolator, adjusting an originally Jewish text.

Relation to Catholic and canonical texts
There are parallels in both style, and theology, between Odes and the writing of Ignatius of Antioch, as well as with the canonical Gospel of John. For example, both Odes and John use the concept of Jesus as Logos, and write in gentle metaphors. Harris lists the following similarities in theme between the Odes and the Johannine literature:
 Christ is the Word
 Christ existed before the foundation of the world (Odes 31, 33)
 Christ bestows living water abundantly
 Christ is the door to everything
 Christ stands to His people in the relation of Lover to Beloved
 Believers love the Lord because He first loved them (Ode 3.3)
 Believers' love to the Christ makes them His friends (Ode 8)
It has been suggested that Ode 22.12 ("the foundation of everything is Your [God's] rock. And upon it You have built Your kingdom, and it became the dwelling-place of the holy ones.") may be an earlier version of the saying in Matthew 16.18

Relation to Gnosticism
Some have doubted the orthodoxy of the Odes, suggesting that they perhaps originated from a heretical or gnostic group. This can be seen in the extensive use of the word "knowledge" (Syr.  ; Gk. γνωσις gnōsis), the slight suggestion that the Saviour needed saving in Ode 8:21c (  — "and the saved (are) in him who was saved") and the image of the Father having breasts that are milked by the Holy Spirit to bring about the incarnation of Christ. In the case of "knowledge", it is always a reference to God's gift of his self-revelation, and, as the Odes are replete with enjoyment in God's good creation, they seem at odds with the gnostic concept of knowledge providing the means of release from the imperfect world. The other images are sometimes considered marks of heresy in the odist, but do have some parallel in early patristic literature.

Scholars such as H. Chadwick, Emerton, and Charlesworth are fully convinced that the text has nothing to do with Gnosticism.

Modern influence

The Odes of Solomon have inspired modern musicians and their projects.  In 2010, composer John Schreiner released a two-disc album called The Odes Project, which is an adaptation of the Odes of Solomon into modern music.  The album Odes by Arthur Hatton, creator of LDS music website Linescratchers, was inspired by the Odes of Solomon and incorporated lines from the poems into its lyrics.

See also
Psalms of Solomon (1st-century text)
Wisdom of Solomon
Apostolic fathers

References

Primary published sources
 Bernard, JH (1912). "The Odes of Solomon" in Texts and Studies VIII.
 Charlesworth, James H (1977). The Odes of Solomon. Missoula, Montana: Scholars Press. .
 Franzmann, M (1991). The Odes of Solomon: Analysis of the Poetical Structure and Form. Göttingen.
 Harris, JR and A Mingana (1916, 1920. The Odes and Psalms of Solomon in 2 vols. Manchester.
 Vleugels, Gie. The Odes of Solomon: Syriac Text and English Translation with Text Critical and Explanatory Notes. MŌRĀN ETH’Ō 41. Kottayam: St. Ephrem Ecumenical Research Institute, 2016.

Secondary published sources
 Chadwick, H (1970). "Some reflections on the character and theology of the Odes of Solomon" in Kyriakon: Festschrift für J Quasten vol. 1, ed. P Granfield and JA Jungmann.
 Drijvers, Han Jan Willem (1984). East of Antioch: Studies in Early Syriac Christianity. Aldershot: Ashgate Variorum Reprints. .
 Pierce, Mark (1984). "Themes in the Odes of Solomon and other early Christian writings and their baptismal character" in Ephemerides Liturgicae XCVIII".
 Vleugels, Gie (2011). "The Destruction of the Second Temple in the Odes of Solomon", in: Das heilige Herz der Tora Festschrift für Hendrik Koorevaar, ed.  Siegbert Riecker and Julius Steinberg, Aachen: Shaker Verlag. , 303-310

External links
 Harris, J. Rendel "The Odes And Psalms Of Solomon: Published From The Syriac Version" 2nd ed. 1911
 Harris, J. Rendel and Mingana "The Odes and Psalms of Solomon" vol. 1: the text, 1916 (facsimiles of Syriac and Latin manuscripts)
 Harris, J. Rendel and Mingana "The Odes and Psalms of Solomon" vol. 2: the translation, 1920 (no copiable text, but much smaller filesize)
 Harris, J. Rendel and Mingana "The Odes and Psalms of Solomon" vol. 2: the translation, 1920 (copiable text from OCR, but very large filesize)
 Brahmachari Prangopal (aka. Simeon Goldstein) "The Odes of Solomon: Introduction and Translation"
 Charlesworth, James (Translator). "The Odes of Solomon." Early Christian Writings.
 Charlesworth, James (Translator). "The Odes of Solomon" Archived from misericordia.edu.
 J.B. Lightfoot or R.H. Charles, translator "The Odes of Solomon" 1913 in Rutherford Hayes Platt "The lost books of the Bible and The forgotten books of Eden." (Collins-World Publishers, 1926).
Jackson H. Snyder II "The Odes Of Shalomé: Ancient Netzari Songs of Extraterrestrial Love" (Snyder is a messianic Jewish Christian author)
 
 Internet Archive SearchOdes of Solomon in Early Christian Writings''

Texts in Syriac
Old Testament pseudepigrapha
Solomon